The Alaska Department of Commerce, Community and Economic Development (DCCED or DCED) is a department within the government of Alaska. The department contains the  Control Office (AMCO).

See also
 List of company registers

References

External links
 

Commerce